Kildrummy is a hamlet in Aberdeenshire, Scotland near the River Don,  west of Alford. The hamlet's primary school closed in 2003.

Its church was built in 1805. Nearby Kildrummy Castle has a long history dating back to at least the 14th century.

Sources
Kildrummy in the Gazetteer for Scotland.

Specific

Villages in Aberdeenshire